Fist & Palm is the third studio album by indie music artist Oliver Kalb, under his pseudonym Bellows. The idea for the concept album came from one of Kalb's closest relationships coming to an end.
Overall, the album is described as inspired by folk and indie music, but also contains musical elements of traditional popular music. The sound and feel are soothing and melodic.
The lyrics attempt to portray feelings of both parties of the friendship, and all different related emotions, such as anger, loss and lament. The majority of the album was composed during one month, October 2014, as part of a song-a-day challenge.

Track listing

Personnel
 Oliver Kalb – artwork, composer, engineer
 Gabrielle Smith – string and choral arrangements
 Paul Gold – mastering

References

2016 albums